The Statute Law Revision Act 2015 is a Statute Law Revision Act enacted by the Oireachtas in Ireland to review secondary legislation (mainly proclamations and orders) passed from 1066 to 1820.  The Act revoked a large number of pieces of secondary legislation of Ireland, England, Great Britain and the United Kingdom while preserving a shorter list of instruments that were deemed suitable for retention.

The Act is part of the Statute Law Revision Programme which has also seen the enactment of statute law revision legislation between 2005 and 2016.  The Act also amended the Statutory Instruments Act 1947 to remove most exemptions from the requirement to publish statutory instruments.

Scope
The Act preserved a total of 43 pre-1821 instruments, while revoking 5,782 explicitly and around 7,000 implicitly.

References

External links
The Statute Law Revision Act 2015 from the Irish Statute Book.

2015 in Irish law
Acts of the Oireachtas of the 2010s
Legal history of Ireland
Statute Law Revision 2015